
This is a list of players who graduated from the Challenge Tour in 2006. The top 20 players on the Challenge Tour's money list in 2006 earned their European Tour card for 2007.

* European Tour rookie in 2007
T = Tied 
 The player retained his European Tour card for 2008 (finished inside the top 117).
 The player did not retain his European Tour Tour card for 2008, but retained conditional status (finished between 118-149).
 The player did not retain his European Tour card for 2008 (finished outside the top 149).

The players ranked 16th through 20th were placed below the Qualifying School graduates on the exemption list, and thus could improve their status by competing in Qualifying School. Álvaro Quirós improved his status in this way.

Winners on the European Tour in 2007

Runners-up on the European Tour in 2007

See also
2006 European Tour Qualifying School graduates
2007 European Tour

External links
Final ranking for 2006

Challenge Tour
European Tour
Challenge Tour Graduates
Challenge Tour Graduates